The 1933 United States Senate special election in Virginia was held on November 7, 1933. Byrd had been appointed to fill the vacancy left by Claude A. Swanson after Swanson became the U.S. Secretary of the Navy earlier in the year.

Results

See also 
 1933 United States Senate elections

References

Virginia
Virginia 1933
United States Senate
United States Senate 1933
1933
Virginia
November 1933 events in the United States